Ronald Ross may refer to:

 Ronald Ross (1857–1932), English physician and Nobel laureate; discoverer of the malaria parasite
 Sir Ronald Ross, 2nd Baronet (1888–1968), Irish politician; Ulster Unionist Northern Irish Member of Parliament
 Ronald Ross (basketball) (born 1983), American professional basketball player
 Ronald Ross (shinty player) (born 1975), Scottish sportsman; shinty player for Kingussie
 Ronnie Ross (1933–1991), British jazz baritone saxophonist
 Ronald J. Ross, American radiologist